Rissoa mirabilis is a species of minute sea snail, a marine gastropod mollusc or micromollusc in the family Rissoidae.

Description

Distribution

References

External links

Rissoidae
Gastropods described in 1868